Elisa Balsamo (born 12 August 1983) is an Italian former professional tennis player.

Her highest WTA singles ranking is 329, which she achieved on 1 December 2008. Her career-high in doubles is 307, which she reached on 16 June 2008. In her career, she won five singles and six doubles titles on the ITF Circuit.

ITF Circuit finals

Singles: 7 (5–2)

Doubles: 14 (6–8)

References

External links
 
 

1983 births
Living people
Italian female tennis players
People from Pontedera
Sportspeople from the Province of Pisa
20th-century Italian women
21st-century Italian women